Arielulus is a genus of vesper bats with the following species: 

Genus Arielulus
Bronze sprite (A. circumdatus)
Coppery sprite (A. cuprosus)
Social sprite (A. societatis)
The collared sprite (T. aureocollaris) and necklace sprite (T. torquatus) in the genus Thainycteris were formerly also classified in Arielulus, but phylogenetic evidence supports them forming a distinct genus.

References 

 
Bat genera